RIOJA-2 was a submarine telecommunications cable system  linking the United Kingdom and Belgium across the North Atlantic Ocean/English Channel.

It had landing points in:
Porthcurno, Cornwall, United Kingdom
De Panne, West Flanders, Belgium

It was withdrawn from service on 13 October 2006.

References
 Kingfisher information site
 FreeLibrary article

Submarine communications cables in the English Channel
Belgium–United Kingdom relations
De Panne
2006 disestablishments in England
2006 disestablishments in Belgium